Tenero railway station is a railway station in the municipality of Tenero-Contra, in the Swiss canton of Ticino. It is an intermediate stop on the standard gauge Giubiasco–Locarno line of Swiss Federal Railways.

Services 
 the following services stop at Tenero:

References

External links 
 
 

Railway stations in Ticino
Swiss Federal Railways stations